Driver Madyapichirunnu is a 1979 Indian Malayalam film,  directed by S. K. Subhash. The film stars Sudheer, Kaviyoor Ponnamma, Prameela, Alummoodan and KPAC Sunny in the lead roles. The film has musical score by K. Raghavan.

Cast
Sudheer
Kaviyoor Ponnamma
Prameela
Alummoodan
KPAC Sunny
Kaduvakulam Antony

Soundtrack
The music was composed by K. Raghavan and the lyrics were written by Kallada Sasi.

References

External links
 

1979 films
1970s Malayalam-language films